Pterocarpus santalinus, with the common names red sanders, red saunders, Yerra Chandanam, Chenchandanam, red sandalwood, Rakta Chandana, and saunderswood, is a species of Pterocarpus endemic to the southern Eastern Ghats mountain range of South India. This tree is valued for the rich red colour of its wood, and in recent years there has been a marked uptick in the use of red sandalwood as a component of incense, especially in the west. The tree is not to be confused with the aromatic Santalum sandalwood trees that grow natively in Southern India.

Description

It is not frost tolerant, being killed by temperatures of −1 °C.

The leaves are alternate, 3–9 cm long, trifoliate with three leaflets.

The flowers are produced in short racemes. The fruit is a pod 6–9 cm long containing one or two seeds.

Uses

Timber

The wood has historically been valued in China, particularly during the Qing dynasty periods, and is referred to in Chinese as zitan (紫檀) and spelt tzu-t'an by earlier western authors such as Gustav Ecke, who introduced classical Chinese hardwood furniture to the west. An exquisite chair made of red sandalwood can be seen today in China's Forbidden City in Beijing, inside the Hall of Supreme Harmony, and once used by the emperors of the Qing dynasty.

Due to its slow growth and rarity, furniture made from zitan is difficult to find and can be expensive. It has been one of the most prized woods for millennia.

In India sandalwood is one main and lucrative market for smugglers, as a high price is paid for this wood in China. Since the exporting of sandalwood is illegal in India, the underground market is growing and there are a number of arrests every year of those trying to smuggle this wood to China.

The other form of zitan is from the species Dalbergia louvelii, Dalbergia maritima, and Dalbergia normandii, all similar species named in trade as bois de rose or violet rosewood which when cut are bright crimson purple changing to dark purple again. It has a fragrant scent when worked.

Shamisen
Red sandalwood has been used for making the bridge and also the neck of the Japanese musical instrument shamisen. The heartwood is preferred for this purpose.

Medicinal values
Pterocarpus santalinus is used in traditional herbal medicine as an antipyretic, anti-inflammatory, anthelmintic, tonic, hemorrhage, dysentery, aphrodisiac, anti-hyperglycaemic and diaphoretic.

Grading of red sandalwood

Lumber pieces with the wavy grain margin are graded as "A" grade. Red sandalwood with wavy grain margins sells at higher prices than the standard wood.

Conservation status
Pterocarpus santalinus was listed as an Endangered species by the IUCN, because of overexploitation for its timber in South India; however, it was later reclassified to Near Threatened in 2018, as the scale of this loss is not properly known.
It is also listed in the appendix II of the CITES, which means that a certificate is required in order to export it, that should only be granted if the trade is not detrimental to the survival of the species.

Gallery

In popular culture 

 Veerappan (2016), had mention about Sandalwood smuggler Veerappan.
 The 2021 Telugu film Pushpa: The Rise'''s plot revolves around Red Sandalwood smuggling.

See also
 Algum
 Adenanthera pavonina''
 Sandalwood Plantation

References

External links
 Jstor.org: Pterocarpus santalinus
 

santalinus
Endemic flora of India (region)
Eastern Ghats
Flora of Tamil Nadu
Environment of Andhra Pradesh
Wood
Threatened flora of Asia